Paul Marks may refer to:
Paul Marks (cricketer) (born 1967), English cricketer
Paul Marks (scientist) (born 1926), medical doctor, researcher and administrator
Paul D. Marks (died 2021), American novelist and short story writer
Paul Marks (referee), rugby referee, see 2008 IRB Pacific Nations Cup
Paul Marks, producer of the late 1990s TV series Time of Your Life

See also
Paul Marx (disambiguation)
Paul Mark (fl. 2000s–2020s), member of the Massachusetts House of Representatives